A Twenty20 International (T20I) is an international cricket match between two teams that have official T20I status, as determined by the International Cricket Council. It is played under the rules of Twenty20 cricket and is the shortest form of the game. The first such match was played on 17 February 2005 between Australia and New Zealand.  The England cricket team played its first T20I match on 13 June 2005, against Australia as part of Australia's 2005 Ashes tour, winning the match by 100 runs.

This list is of all members of the England cricket team who have played at least one T20I match. The order is by each player name as they achieved a first Twenty20 cap; achievement by several players during the same match is arranged by surname alphabetically.

Key

Players
Statistics are correct as of 14 March 2023.

Captains

Notes

References

Cricketers, Twenty20
England